Hexosan may refer to:
 Any of a group of polysaccharide hemicelluloses that hydrolyze to hexose
 Hexachlorophene, an organochlorine compound that has been used as a disinfectant (trade name Hexosan)